Grinius is a Lithuanian language family name. It may refer to:
Kazys Grinius, 3rd President of Lithuania
Kęstutis Grinius, Lithuanian politician
Marius Grinius, Canadian diplomat

 
Lithuanian-language surnames